Andrés Eduardo Mistage Parilli (born in Valencia, Carabobo, Venezuela on September 11, 1981) is a Venezuelan model and actor who won the title of Mister Venezuela in 2003. He represented Carabobo state.

Mistage was the official representative of Venezuela for the Mister World 2003 pageant in London, England, on August 9, 2003, when he placed in the Top 10 Semifinalists.

References

External links
Mister World official website
Mister Venezuela 2003 Photogallery
Monarcas de Venezuela Blog
Miss Venezuela La Nueva Era MB

Male beauty pageant winners
Living people
1981 births
Venezuelan male telenovela actors